Panurginus is a genus of bees in the family Andrenidae. There are more than 50 described species in Panurginus.

Species
These 55 species belong to the genus Panurginus:

 Panurginus albitarsis
 Panurginus albopilosus Lucas, 1846
 Panurginus alpinus Warncke, 1972
 Panurginus alpotanini Romankova & Astafurova, 2011-29
 Panurginus alticolus Morawitz, 1876
 Panurginus annulatus Sichel, 1859
 Panurginus armaticeps Cockerell, 1916
 Panurginus arsenievi Romankova & Astafurova, 2011-29
 Panurginus atramontensis Crawford, 1926
 Panurginus atriceps Cresson, 1878 - black-tipped miner bee
 Panurginus barletae Patiny, 2002
 Panurginus beardsleyi Cockerell, 1904 - Beardsley's miner bee
 Panurginus bilobatus Michener, 1937
 Panurginus brullei Lepeletier, 1841
 Panurginus ceanothi Michener, 1935
 Panurginus clarus Warncke, 1987
 Panurginus corpanus Warncke, 1972
 Panurginus crawfordi Cockerell, 1914
 Panurginus cressoniellus Cockerell, 1898 - Cresson's miner bee
 Panurginus emarginatus Michener, 1935
 Panurginus flavipes Morawitz, 1895
 Panurginus flavotarsus Wu, 1992
 Panurginus gabrielis Michener, 1935
 Panurginus gracilis Michener, 1935
 Panurginus herzi Morawitz, 1892
 Panurginus ineptus Cockerell, 1922 - inept miner bee
 Panurginus kozlovi Romankova & Astafurova, 2011-29
 Panurginus kropotkini Romankova & Astafurova, 2011-29
 Panurginus labiatus Eversmann, 1852
 Panurginus lactipennis Friese, 1897
 Panurginus maritimus Michener, 1935
 Panurginus melanocephalus Cockerell, 1926
 Panurginus mikhno Romankova & Astafurova, 2011-29
 Panurginus minutulus Warncke, 1987
 Panurginus montanus Giraud, 1861
 Panurginus morawitzii Friese, 1897
 Panurginus muraviovi Romankova & Astafurova, 2011-29
 Panurginus niger Nylander, 1848
 Panurginus nigrellus Crawford, 1926
 Panurginus nigrihirtus Michener, 1935
 Panurginus nigripes Morawitz, 1880
 Panurginus obruchevi Romankova & Astafurova, 2011-29
 Panurginus occidentalis Crawford, 1916
 Panurginus picipes Morawitz, 1890
 Panurginus picitarsis Cockerell, 1912-01
 Panurginus polytrichus Cockerell, 1909
 Panurginus ponticus Warncke, 1972
 Panurginus potentillae Crawford, 1916
 Panurginus romani Aurivillius, 1914
 Panurginus schwarzi Warncke, 1972
 Panurginus semiopacus Morawitz, 1895
 Panurginus sericatus Warncke, 1972
 Panurginus tunensis Warncke, 1972
 Panurginus turcomanicus Popov, 1936
 Panurginus tyrolensis Richards, 1932

References

Further reading

External links

 

Andrenidae
Bee genera
Articles created by Qbugbot